Brzozowa may refer to the following places:
Brzozowa, Lublin Voivodeship (east Poland)
Brzozowa, Grajewo County in Podlaskie Voivodeship (north-east Poland)
Brzozowa, Mońki County in Podlaskie Voivodeship (north-east Poland)
Brzozowa, Lesser Poland Voivodeship (south Poland)
Brzozowa, Opatów County in Świętokrzyskie Voivodeship (south-central Poland)
Brzozowa, Staszów County in Świętokrzyskie Voivodeship (south-central Poland)
Brzozowa, Włoszczowa County in Świętokrzyskie Voivodeship (south-central Poland)
Brzozowa, Masovian Voivodeship (east-central Poland)
Brzozowa, Lubusz Voivodeship (west Poland)